Nikolskaya is a rural locality (a village) in Beketovskoye Rural Settlement, Vozhegodsky District, Vologda Oblast, Russia. The population was 56 as of 2002.

Geography 
Nikolskaya is located 71 km southwest of Vozhega (the district's administrative centre) by road. Anisimovskaya is the nearest rural locality.

References 

Rural localities in Vozhegodsky District